Nur Sürer (born 21 June 1954) is a Turkish actress.

Her debut role was in Bereketli Topraklar Üzerinde, directed by Erden Kiral. She is known for her more politically themed roles, notably with regard to prison conditions and women's rights. So far, she has appeared in more than 40 films.

Filmography

Awards 
1982 Antalya Golden Orange Film Festival, "Best actress", Bir Günün Hikayesi
1989 Antalya Golden Orange Film Festival, "Best actress", Uçurtmayı Vurmasınlar
2002 Ankara Film Festival, "Best actress, Sır Çocukları

References

External links

1954 births
People from Bursa
Living people
Turkish film actresses
Best Actress Golden Orange Award winners
Turkish stage actresses
Golden Orange Life Achievement Award winners
20th-century Turkish actresses
21st-century Turkish actresses